The Acropolis International Tournament 2017 was a basketball tournament held in OAKA Indoor Hall in Athens, Greece, from August 23 until August 25, 2017. It was the 28th edition of the Acropolis International Basketball Tournament. The four participating teams were Greece, Georgia, Italy, and Serbia.

Venues

Participating teams

Standings 

|+Champions for the 2017
|-bgcolor="gold"

|}

Results 
All times are local Central European Summer Time (UTC+2).

Final standing

References

External links
Acropolis Cup 2017 Results

Acropolis International Basketball Tournament
Acropolis
2017–18 in Greek basketball
2017–18 in Italian basketball
2017–18 in Serbian basketball
2017–18 in Georgian basketball